Topa ou Não Topa is the Brazilian version of Deal or No Deal, broadcast in Portuguese by SBT. It is hosted by Silvio Santos. There are 26 cases, containing amounts from R$ 0.50 (US$0.16) to R$1,000,000 (US$320,000). On August 25, 2010, the gameshow returned and the host is Roberto Justus but in similar set to the old version.

Like most sets of Brazilian versions of US game shows, their set and graphics are a dead ringer to the American counterpart.

The R$1,000,000 grand prize was won by a man named Paulo in April 2007.

Case values 
2006-2011

2019–present

External links 
 SBT Topa ou Não Topa Official website

Deal or No Deal
2006 Brazilian television series debuts
2010 Brazilian television series endings